Mazharul Haque Prodhan (born January 1, 1953) is a Bangladesh Awami League politician and the incumbent Member of Parliament of Panchagarh-1.

Career
Prodhan was elected to parliament from Panchagarh-1 as a Bangladesh Awami League candidate 30 December 2018.

References

Awami League politicians
Living people
9th Jatiya Sangsad members
11th Jatiya Sangsad members
1953 births